Dr. George M. Willing House, also known as the Fleming Home and Joseph Denton Home, is a historic home located at Fulton, Callaway County, Missouri.  It was built about 1855, and is a two-story, five bay, Greek Revival style brick dwelling.  It has a side gable roof and features six colossal pilasters which divide the front facade and a massive hand carved solid walnut circular stairway in the front-entrance hall.

The house was listed on the National Register of Historic Places in 1980.

References 

Houses on the National Register of Historic Places in Missouri
Greek Revival houses in Missouri
Houses completed in 1855
Houses in Callaway County, Missouri
National Register of Historic Places in Callaway County, Missouri